Bursa latitudo is a species of sea snail, a marine gastropod mollusk in the family Bursidae, the frog shells.

Description
The length of the shell varies between 75 mm and 95 mm.

Distribution
This marine species occurs off South Queensland, Australia and the Philippines

References

External links
 

Bursidae
Gastropods described in 1961